This article lists the official squads for the 2013 Women's Rugby League World Cup.

Squads

Australia
  played four matches in the tournament. They were coached by Paul Dyer. Karyn Murphy and Tahnee Norris were captain and vice-captain, or co-captains. The Australian team for the tournament was, as follows:

England
 played four matches during the tournament. They were coached by Chris Chapman and captained by Natalie Gilmour. The England team was as follows:

France
 played four matches during the tournament. The French team were the only team to not select the permitted 24 players. They selected 22. The match report on the European Rugby League website lists all 22 players for France's first match against New Zealand, rather than just the 17 that played.  The one try scored by France during the tournament was registered by Elisa Ciria. The French squad was as follows:

New Zealand
  played four matches during the tournament. They were coached by Lynley Tierney-Mani and captained by Honey Hireme. Teina Clark was selected in the squad but did not travel to England due to suspension. The New Zealand team was as follows:

References

Women's Rugby League World Cup
Wor